Ryan Donnelly is the name of:

Ryan Donnelly (Canadian football) (born 1978), guard
Ryan Donnelly (footballer) (born 1991), Scottish footballer
Ryan Donnelly (pharmaceutical scientist), pharmaceutical scientist